The Scene Club was a 1960s music venue in Ham Yard, 41 Great Windmill Street, Soho, central London, England. The club opened in 1963 and was associated with the mod youth subculture.

Bands that appeared at the club included the Rolling Stones and The Who.

References

External links
 Scene Club Soho London on YouTube

1963 establishments in England
Year of disestablishment missing
Music venues in London
1960s in London
1960s in music
Social history of London
History of the City of Westminster